Celia D. Costas is a film producer. She won two Emmy Awards for the HBO miniseries Angels in America and the television film Warm Springs and was nominated for a third Emmy Award for the television film For Love or Country: The Arturo Sandoval Story. She has also received a Producers Guild of America Award for Angels in America. She is a member of the advisory board of the Feirstein Graduate School of Cinema at Brooklyn College.

Filmography

Awards

References

External links 
 

Primetime Emmy Award winners
American film producers
American television producers
American women television producers